Karl Bergemann Parsons (23 January 1884 – 30 September 1934) was a British stained glass artist associated with the Arts and Crafts movement.

Early life, 1884 – 1898
Parsons was born in Peckham in south London on 23 January 1884, the 12th and youngest child of Arthur William Parsons (1838–1901), a foreign language translator, and Emma Matilda Parsons, née Bergemann (1837–1914).  He was christened with the names Charles Bergemann, though the family always called him Karl, the name he was to use in later life.

From 1893 to 1898 he attended Haberdashers' Aske's Hatcham Boys School at New Cross in south London.

Introduction to Whall, 1898 – outbreak of war

One of Parsons’ older sisters was the artist Beatrice Emma Parsons (1869–1955). Beatrice worked for a while in Christopher Whall’s studio and when Parsons left school, Beatrice persuaded Whall to take him on as an apprentice.  Whall it seems saw promise in Parsons' sketches.  Apart from starting with Whall as a pupil-apprentice at Whall’s Hammersmith studio, he also worked at Lowndes and Drury in Chelsea, this under Whall’s supervision.  He also attended Whall’s classes at the L.C.C. Central School of Arts & Crafts.

He completed his apprenticeship in the 1900s and then worked as one of Whall’s assistants. In September 1904 he began teaching at the Central School, initially as one of Whall’s assistants and then as principal teacher of stained glass. One pupil was M. E. Aldrich Rope, cousin of Margaret Agnes Rope. Another pupil was Joan Fulleylove who worked with Mabel Esplin and in fact continued Esplin's work for the Anglican cathedral in Khartoum when Esplin could no longer do so.

Throughout the 1900s he was to assist Whall on his major commissions and in 1905 drew some of the illustrations for Whall’s book Stained Glass Work this along with fellow student Edward Woore.  Parsons assisted Whall with the windows for Gloucester Cathedral and also those for Canterbury Cathedral, Southwell Minster, Tonbridge School Chapel, and churches in Ashbourne, Ledbury and Burford.

In 1907 he married Grace Millicent Simmons.  She too studied at the Central School and became an Arts and Crafts embroiderer.

In 1908 he worked with Whall on the design and execution of apse windows for Cape Town Cathedral and in that year set up his own studio at the Glass House in Fulham. In the same year he began work on his first independent commission, a series of windows for St Alban, Hindhead. He also exhibited three designs at the Royal Academy and 25 September 1908 saw the birth of his daughter Margaret Rosetta.

It was the architect Herbert Baker who had asked Whall to take on the Cape Town windows and it was Baker’s associate Fleming, who in later years was to invite Parsons to undertake other commissions in South Africa. Close connections with architects were important to people like Parsons and he was to have a similar relationship with Robert Lorimer in Scotland which was to lead to his receiving important Scottish commissions.  Other important contacts were John Duke Coleridge, and Everard and Pick.  Whall had similarly benefitted from close ties to the likes of the architects John Dando Sedding and Henry Wilson.

During the period 1909 to 1910, he worked for a short period with Louis Davis, cartooning windows from Davis’ designs.  In 1910 he exhibited designs at the Arts and Crafts Exhibition.  Certainly Parsons worked closely with Davis in 1910 on the windows for St Anseln church (seven lancets for the Holy Spirit chapel) and Holy Trinity in St Andrew’s Fife (a five-light Crucifixion window). It was Davis who had introduced Parsons to Robert Lorimer. In 1910, Parsons lived at 38 Gainsborough Road in Bedford Park, London.

1911 saw the birth of his second daughter, Jacynth Mary, who became a book illustrator.

In 1912 he received a commission for the Rolls and Grace memorial window at Eastchurch on the Isle of Sheppey and in the next year his work was exhibited at the Ghent International Exhibition.  It was in 1913 that Parsons met the Irish artist Harry Clarke.  One was to influence the other.

1914 – 1930

The Great War saw many of the Glass House staff leave to do military service and in 1916 Parsons himself was conscripted into the 
Army but was not posted overseas.

Demobilised in 1918, he resumed work at the Glass House and went back to teaching at the Central School.  As a teacher, Parsons was, like Whall before him, to inspire several of his pupils to become stained glass artists, including Lilian Pocock, Joseph E. Nuttgens and Herbert Hendrie.

After the war there was a boom in demand for stained glass, particularly with many memorial windows being commissioned and Parsons appointed Edward Liddall Armitage as an assistant and later Leonard Potter. Both were ex-pupils.

1924 saw Parsons make what was to prove a seminal visit to Chartres where, with his brother Ambrose, he carried out a detailed study of medieval glass.  Parsons wrote "So far as my knowledge goes, this world cannot show anything made by men so amazingly beautiful".

In 1927 he was commissioned to make the apse windows for the new St Mary’s Cathedral in Johannesburg.

1929 saw a collection of poems that he had written published by the Medici Society under the title Ann’s Book. His daughter Jacynth provided the illustrations. (The previous year she had illustrated Forty Nine Poems by W. H. Davies, also for Medici). Over the years Parsons had several of his poems published in anthologies and periodicals.  In the same year he resigned from his teaching post at the Central School.

1930 to 1934 – final years

In 1930 Parsons moved from Northwood, where he had lived for many years, to Shalbourne in Wiltshire.  There he set up a studio at Ropewind Farm where he converted a mid-18th century three-bay barn, adding a large, porch-like window to let in natural light on the north side.  He also incorporated a small granary on unusual brick and timber staddles thus converting it into a larger purpose-built storage building and garage, giving access directly from Rivar Road. The house he lived in adjoined the site.  It should have been an idyllic time for Parsons but his health deteriorated and finally, in 1933, he had to return to London, took a flat in Putney and worked for a while with his great friend Edward Woore. He died there the following year at the young age of 50.  After his death on 30 September 1934, the cause of death being given as cerebral thrombosis and arteriosclerosis, existing commissions were taken over or completed by Woore.

Works

Gallery

Notes

References

External links
 Flickr photographers' pool of Karl Parsons' work

1884 births
1934 deaths
British stained glass artists and manufacturers
People from Shalbourne
People from Hillingdon
People from Peckham
Military personnel from Surrey
British Army personnel of World War I
British Army soldiers